St John Street is a historic street located in Clerkenwell, Islington, north London, England.

The street runs from Smithfield Market and Charterhouse Street in the south to the junction of City Road and Pentonville Road (near Upper Street) in the north, close to the Angel tube station. It is the first section of the original route of the Great North Road.

The Red Bull Theatre was located on the street between 1604 and 1666, when it was destroyed in the Great Fire of London. James Burnett, Lord Monboddo (1714–1799) lived at 13 St John Street. He held "learned suppers" at his house, with guests including James Boswell, Robert Burns and Samuel Johnson. Nowadays there are many office buildings, restaurants, and bars in the street.

References

External links
 ViewLondon.co.uk information 
 LondonTown.com information

Streets in the City of London
Streets in the London Borough of Islington